Mytilidae are a family of small to large marine and brackish-water bivalve molluscs in the order Mytilida. One of the genera, Limnoperna, even inhabits freshwater environments. The order has only this one family which contains some 52 genera.

Species in the family Mytilidae are found worldwide, but they are more abundant in colder seas, where they often form uninterrupted beds on rocky shores in the intertidal zone and the shallow subtidal. The subfamily Bathymodiolinae is found in deep-sea habitats.

Mytilids include the well-known edible sea mussels.

A common feature of the shells of mussels is an asymmetrical shell which has a thick, adherent periostracum.  The animals attach themselves to a solid substrate using a byssus.

A 2020 study of the phylogeny of Mytilidae recovered two main clades derived from an epifaunal ancestor, with subsequent lineages shifting to other lifestyles, and correlating convergent evolution of siphon traits.

Genera

Genera within the family Mytilidae include:
 Adipicola Dautzenberg, 1927
 Adula H. Adams & A. Adams, 1857    
 Amygdalum Megerle von Muhlfeld, 1811    
 Arcuatula Jousseaume in Lamy, 1919 (incl. Musculista)
 Arenifodiens Wilson, 2006
 Arvella Bartsch, 1960
 Aulacomya Mörch, 1853    
 Bathymodiolus Kenk & Wilson, 1985
 Benthomodiolus Dell, 1987
 Botula Mörch, 1853    
 Brachidontes Swainson, 1840
 Choromytilus Soot-Ryen, 1952
 Crenella T. Brown, 1827
 Crenomytilus Soot-Ryen, 1955    
 Dacrydium Torell, 1859  
 Exosiperna Iredale, 1929
 Fungiacava T. F. Goreau, N. I. Goreau, Neumann & Yonge, 1968  
 Geukensia Van de Poel, 1959
 Gibbomodiola Sacco, 1898 
 Gigantidas  Cosel & Marshall, 2003
 Gregariella Monterosato, 1884   
 Idas Jeffreys, 1876 
 Idasola Iredale, 1939    
 Ischadium Jukes-Browne, 1905 
 Jolya Bourguignat, 1877 
 Leiosolenus Carpenter, 1857
 Limnoperna Rochebrune, 1882  
 Lioberus Dall, 1898    
 Lithophaga Röding, 1798    
 Megacrenella Habe & Ito, 1965
 Modiolatus Jousseaume, 1893    
 Modiolula Sacco, 1898 
 Modiolarca Gray, 1842      
 Modiolus Lamarck, 1799  
 Musculus Röding, 1798
 Mytella Soot-Ryen, 1955
 Mytilaster Monterosato, 1884  
 Mytilus Linnaeus, 1758; includes most edible mussel species
 Perna Philipsson, 1788 - incl. New Zealand green-lipped mussel
 Perumytilus Olsson, 1961
 Rhomboidella Monterosato, 1884 
 Semimytilus Soot-Ryen, 1955   
 Septifer Recluz, 1848
 Sinomytilus Thiele, 1934    
 Solamen Iredale, 1924
 Stavelia Gray, 1858 
 Tamu Gustafson, Turner, Lutz & Vrijenhoek, 1998   
 Trichomya Ihering, 1900
 Urumella Hayami & Kase, 1993    
 Vilasina Bartsch, 1960
 Vulcanidas Cosel & B. A. Marshall, 2010
 Xenostrobus Wilson, 1967
 Zelithophaga Finlay, 1926

References

External links

 
Bivalve families
Taxa named by Constantine Samuel Rafinesque